Südangeln is an Amt ("collective municipality") in the district of Schleswig-Flensburg, in Schleswig-Holstein, Germany. The seat of the Amt is in Böklund.

The Amt Südangeln consists of the following municipalities:

Ämter in Schleswig-Holstein